Nikolas Carlyle Turley (born September 11, 1989) is an American professional baseball pitcher for the Hiroshima Toyo Carp of Nippon Professional Baseball (NPB). He has played in Major League Baseball for the Minnesota Twins in 2017 and Pittsburgh Pirates in 2020.

Career

New York Yankees

Turley attended Harvard-Westlake School, where he played for the school's baseball team. He committed to attend Brigham Young University (BYU) on a scholarship to play college baseball for the BYU Cougars baseball team. Out of high school, the New York Yankees selected Turley in the 50th round, with the 1,502nd selection, of the 2008 Major League Baseball Draft. Turley was the third-to-last selection in the draft. Turley agreed to sign with the Yankees, forgoing college.

Turley spent the 2008 and 2009 seasons with the Gulf Coast Yankees of the Rookie-level Gulf Coast League. He pitched for the Staten Island Yankees of the Class A-Short Season New York–Penn League in 2010. He played with the Charleston RiverDogs of the Class A South Atlantic League in 2011 and the Tampa Yankees of the Class A-Advanced Florida State League in 2012. After the season, the Yankees named Turley their minor league pitcher of the year, and added him to their 40 man roster after the 2012 season to protect him from being selected by another team in the annual Rule 5 draft.

In 2013, Turley pitched for the Trenton Thunder of the Class AA Eastern League, and made one start for the Scranton/Wilkes-Barre RailRiders of the Class AAA International League. On the season, Turley had an 11–8 win–loss record with a 3.88 earned run average. He started and won Game One of the 2013 Eastern League Championship Series.

Attending spring training in 2014, Turley did not pitch due to arm tightness. The Yankees optioned Turley to the minor leagues. He was released by the team on April 26, 2014. He was re-signed on May 8.

San Francisco Giants
Turley signed as a minor league free agent with the San Francisco Giants on December 5, 2014. He elected free agency on November 6, 2015.

Chicago White Sox
Turley signed a minor league contract with the Chicago White Sox on November 24, 2015. He was released on March 26, 2016.

Boston Red Sox
Turley signed a minor league contract with the Boston Red Sox on April 11, 2016. He was released on July 8, 2016.

Somerset Patriots
On July 27, 2016 he signed with the Somerset Patriots of the Atlantic League.

Minnesota Twins
After the 2016 season, Turley signed a minor league contract with the Minnesota Twins. He pitched for the Chattanooga Lookouts of the Class AA Southern League and Rochester Red Wings of the International League before the Twins promoted him to the major leagues on June 11.

Pittsburgh Pirates
On November 5, 2017, the Pittsburgh Pirates claimed Turley off of waivers. Turley was suspended for the first 80 games of the 2018 season after testing positive for a performance-enhancing drug. He was outrighted to AAA on October 4, 2018. He was assigned to AAA Indianapolis Indians on their 7-day IL to start the 2019 season. On July 25, 2020, Turley made his first appearance in the majors since the 2017 season. In 2020, Turley pitched to a 4.98 ERA with 20 strikeouts over 21.2 innings pitched in 25 appearances. On January 12, 2021, Turley was designated for assignment by the Pirates following the acquisition of Troy Stokes Jr.

Oakland Athletics
On January 14, 2021, Turley was traded to the Oakland Athletics in exchange for cash considerations.

Chicago White Sox (second stint)
On March 21, 2021, Turley was claimed off waivers by the Chicago White Sox. On March 30, 2021, Turley was designated for assignment following the signing of Jake Lamb. On April 1, Turley was outrighted. On October 14, Turley elected free agency.

Hiroshima Toyo Carp
On November 9, 2021, Turley signed with the Hiroshima Toyo Carp of Nippon Professional Baseball.

Pitching style
He uses his height to push the ball down into the strike zone and turns his body sideways as he throws to home plate. His pitches include a fastball that averages , a curveball that averages , and a changeup.

Personal life
Turley is a member of The Church of Jesus Christ of Latter-day Saints. He intends to serve as a missionary after he retires from baseball.

Turley has been married to Rachel Turley (née Johnson) since 2011. He grew up in La Cañada, California, and has three older brothers, who all played college sports. Turley describes former Yankee Bob Turley as a "distant relative".

References

External links

1989 births
Living people
People from La Cañada Flintridge, California
Sportspeople from Los Angeles County, California
Baseball players from California
American Latter Day Saints
Major League Baseball pitchers
Minnesota Twins players
Pittsburgh Pirates players
Gulf Coast Yankees players
Staten Island Yankees players
Charleston RiverDogs players
Tampa Yankees players
Trenton Thunder players
Scranton/Wilkes-Barre RailRiders players
Somerset Patriots players
Sacramento River Cats players
San Jose Giants players
Portland Sea Dogs players
Estrellas Orientales players
American expatriate baseball players in the Dominican Republic
Chattanooga Lookouts players
Rochester Red Wings players
Charlotte Knights players
Harvard-Westlake School alumni
Hiroshima Toyo Carp players